Sphegina pusilla is a species of hoverfly in the family Syrphidae.

Distribution
Myanmar.

References

Eristalinae
Insects described in 2015
Diptera of Asia